To Brighton with Gladys is a 1933 British comedy film directed by George King and starring Harry Milton, Constance Shotter and Kate Cutler. It was made at Ealing Studios as a quota quickie.

Cast
 Harry Milton as Bertie Penge  
 Constance Shotter as Florrie 
 Kate Cutler as Aunt Dorothy  
 Sunday Wilshin as Daphne Fitzgerald  
 Melville Cooper as Slingby

References

Bibliography
 Chibnall, Steve. Quota Quickies: The Birth of the British 'B' Film. British Film Institute, 2007.
 Low, Rachael. Filmmaking in 1930s Britain. George Allen & Unwin, 1985.
 Wood, Linda. British Films, 1927-1939. British Film Institute, 1986.

External links

1933 films
British comedy films
1933 comedy films
Films directed by George King
Quota quickies
Films set in England
British black-and-white films
1930s English-language films
1930s British films